Col de la Croix (1778 m high) is an Alpine pass in the canton of Vaud in Switzerland.

It connects Bex and Villars-sur-Ollon with Les Diablerets.

Cycle racing

Details of the climb
The climb from Les Diablerets is 8 km. long, gaining 580 m in height at an average 7.2% grade. Several sections of the climb are well in excess of this with the maximum gradient of 12%.

Tour de France
It was crossed in Stage 9 of the 2022 Tour de France on 10 July, where Simon Geschke was the first rider to reach the top of the col. It was ranked as a Category 1 climb.

See also
 List of highest paved roads in Europe
 List of mountain passes
 List of the highest Swiss passes

References

External links 

Profile on climbbybike.com

Mountain passes of the canton of Vaud
Croix (Vaud)
Croix (Vaud)